Osarhieme Osadolor is a Nigerian professor of history and International studies. He is the author of the collection: Cradle of Ideas, A  Compendium of Speeches and Writings of Omo N’Oba Erediauwa of Great Beni and former Dean of student affairs at the University of Benin. On May 10, 2021, he was appointed as the acting vice-chancellor of the Ambrose Alli University where he served for 10 months until his removal on February 8, 2022.

References

See also 

 List of vice chancellors in Nigeria
 Ambrose Alli University

Living people
Vice-Chancellors of Nigerian universities
People from Edo State
Year of birth missing (living people)